MacCormack Provincial Park is a small picnic park overlooking the Bras d'Or Lake, in the community of Plaster Cove, in the Canadian province of Nova Scotia, located in Victoria County on Cape Breton Island.

As one of few public access points to Bras d’Or Lake the park provides beach access with opportunities for beach walking and carry-in boating, and offers picnic tables scattered through a softwood forest overlooking Plaster Cove. There is a public wharf and a beach protected under the Beaches Act adjacent to the park.

References

External links
Things to See & Do - Nova Scotia
A view of Plaster Cove

Provincial parks of Nova Scotia
Tourist attractions in Victoria County, Nova Scotia
Geography of Victoria County, Nova Scotia